Fiji requires its residents to register their motor vehicles and display vehicle registration plates. Current plates are Australian standard 372 mm × 134 mm, and use Australian stamping dies.

References

Weblinks 
 
Fiji license plates at Francoplaque

Fiji
Transport in Fiji
Fiji transport-related lists